Florence Engel Randall (October 18, 1917 – September 4, 1997) was an American author. Randall wrote a total of five novels, as well as over one hundred short stories throughout her career. Randall is perhaps best known for her novel A Watcher in the Woods (1976), which was made into a film of the same name by Walt Disney Pictures in 1980 and a television film of the same name by Lifetime Television in 2017.

Life and career
Randall was born on October 17, 1917 in Brooklyn, New York City. Randall wrote multiple young adult novels, including The Almost Year, which earned recognition as an American Library Association Notable Book upon its 1971 release. Randall died in 1997 in Great Neck, New York, where she lived in her later life. Randall's papers are preserved in a collection at the Gotlieb Archival Research Center at Boston University. There is also a scholarship for women writers granted annually from the university, named The Randall Award.

Works
Hedgerow (1967)
The Place of Sapphires (1969)
The Almost Year (1971)
Haldane Station (1973)
A Watcher in the Woods (1976)
All the Sky Together (1985)

Bibliography

References

1917 births
1997 deaths
20th-century American novelists
American women novelists
American children's writers
Women science fiction and fantasy writers
American women children's writers
Writers from New York City
20th-century American women writers
Novelists from New York (state)